Early legislative elections were held on 30 January 2022 in Portugal to elect members of the Assembly of the Republic to the 15th Legislature of the Third Portuguese Republic. All 230 seats to the Assembly of the Republic were up for election.

On 27 October 2021, the budget proposed by the Socialist minority government was rejected by the Assembly of the Republic. The Left Bloc (BE) and the Portuguese Communist Party (PCP), both of whom had previously supported the government, joined the centre-right to right-wing opposition parties and rejected the budget. On 4 November 2021, Marcelo Rebelo de Sousa, the president of Portugal, announced a snap election to be held on 30 January 2022. This election was the third held in Portugal during the COVID-19 pandemic, as the country held a presidential election (January) and local elections (September) in 2021. The ruling government led the local elections but suffered losses, especially in Lisbon.

The Socialist Party (PS) of incumbent prime minister António Costa won an unexpected majority government in the Assembly of the Republic, the second in the party's history. The PS received 41.4% of the vote and 120 seats, four seats above the minimum required for a majority. The PS won the most votes in all districts in mainland Portugal, only failing to win the Autonomous Region of Madeira. Political analysts considered the PS to have benefited from voters of the BE and the Unitary Democratic Coalition (CDU) casting their votes for the PS instead.

The Social Democratic Party (PSD) remained stable but underperformed opinion polls that had predicted a close race with the PS. The PSD won 29.1% of the vote, a slightly higher share than in 2019, and received 77 seats, two seats less than the previous election. The PSD was surpassed by the PS in districts like Leiria and Viseu, and lost Bragança by only 15 votes to the PS. In the aftermath of the election, party leader Rui Rio announced he would resign from the leadership.

CHEGA finished in third place, winning 12 seats and 7.2% of the vote. The Liberal Initiative (IL) finished in fourth place, winning 8 seats and 4.9% of the vote. Both parties experienced a surge of voters and made gains this election, though CHEGA received more than 100,000 less votes than its leader had received in the previous year's presidential election, an election in which turnout was lower.

The BE and CDU both suffered significant losses, being surpassed by the IL and CHEGA. Their rejection of the 2022 budget was considered to be a factor in losing votes and seats, along with tactical voting. The BE won 5 seats and 4.4% of the vote. CDU won 6 seats and 4.3% of the vote, while losing seats in Évora and Santarém districts. The Ecologist Party "The Greens" (PEV) lost all their seats for the first time.

The CDS – People's Party (CDS–PP) lost all their seats for the first time, receiving 1.6% of the vote. Party leader Francisco Rodrigues dos Santos announced his resignation. People Animals Nature (PAN) suffered losses as well, winning 1 seat and 1.6% of the vote, 3 fewer seats than in the previous election. LIVRE won 1 seat and received 1.3% of the vote, holding on to the single seat they won in the previous election, with party leader Rui Tavares being elected in Lisbon.

The voter turnout grew, compared with the previous election, with 51.5% of registered voters casting a ballot, despite the ongoing COVID-19 pandemic in Portugal.

After controversies and accusations because of the counting of overseas ballots, the Constitutional Court forced the repetition of the election in the Europe constituency, which elects two MPs. Therefore, the swearing in of the new Parliament and Government was delayed by a month and a half. The rerun of the election in the overseas constituency of Europe occurred, for in person voting, on 12 and 13 March 2022, and postal ballots were received until 23 March 2022. The final, certified results of the election were published in the official journal, Diário da República, on 26 March 2022.

Background

Fall of the government

The proposed budget for 2022 was rejected on October 27, 2021, by all Opposition parties, with the expection of PAN and two Independent MPs, and with the then PS minority being the only one voting in favour. Prime Minister António Costa said to Members of Parliament, in his speech before the final vote, that he would not resign and would ask for a "stable, reinforced and lasting new majority" in the early elections. After this vote, President Marcelo Rebelo de Sousa started hearing parties and convened the Council of State, thus deciding to dissolve Parliament and call a snap election for 30 January 2022.

Leadership changes

Liberal Initiative
Early in December 2019, the Liberal Initiative (IL) elected a new leader after their previous leader, Carlos Guimarães Pinto, stepped down. Their sole MP, João Cotrim de Figueiredo, was elected as leader with 96% of the votes in the party's convention. The results were the following:

|- style="background-color:#E9E9E9"
! align="center" colspan=2 style="width:  60px"|Candidate
! align="center" style="width:  50px"|Votes
! align="center" style="width:  50px"|%
|-
|bgcolor=|
| align=left | João Cotrim de Figueiredo
| align=right | 181
| align=right | 95.8
|-
| colspan=2 align=left | Blank/Invalid ballots
| align=right | 8
| align=right | 4.2
|- style="background-color:#E9E9E9"
| colspan=2 style="text-align:left;" |   Turnout
| align=right | 189
| align=center | 
|-
| colspan="4" align=left|Source: Results
|}

Social Democratic Party

The Social Democrats (PSD), the largest opposition party, held a two-round leadership election on 11 January and 18 January 2020. Three candidates were in the race: incumbent PSD leader Rui Rio, former PSD parliamentary caucus leader Luís Montenegro and current Deputy Mayor of Cascais Miguel Pinto Luz. Around 40,000 party members, out of almost 110,000, were registered to vote. In the first round, on 11 January, Rui Rio polled ahead with 49% of the votes against the 41.4% of Luís Montenegro and 9.6% of Miguel Pinto Luz, with both Rio and Montenegro qualifying for a second round. A week later, on 18 January, Rui Rio was re-elected as PSD leader with 53.2% of the votes, against the 46.8% of Luís Montenegro. In both rounds, turnout of registered members achieved almost 80%. The results were the following:

|- style="background-color:#E9E9E9"
! align="center" rowspan=2 colspan=2 style="width:  60px"|Candidate
! align="center" colspan=2 style="width:  50px"|1st round
! align="center" colspan=2 style="width:  50px"|2nd round
|-
! align="center" style="width:  50px"|Votes
! align="center" style="width:  50px"|%
! align="center" style="width:  50px"|Votes
! align="center" style="width:  50px"|%
|-
|bgcolor=orange|
| align=left | Rui Rio
| align=right | 15,546
| align=right | 49.0
| align=right | 17,157
| align=right | 53.2
|-
|bgcolor=orange|
| align=left | Luís Montenegro
| align=right | 13,137
| align=right | 41.4
| align=right | 15,086
| align=right | 46.8
|-
|bgcolor=orange|
| align=left | Miguel Pinto Luz
| align=right | 3,030
| align=right | 9.6
|colspan="2"| 
|-
| colspan=2 align=left | Blank/Invalid ballots
| align=right | 369
| align=right | –
| align=right | 341
| align=right | –
|-
|- style="background-color:#E9E9E9"
| colspan=2 style="text-align:left;" |   Turnout
| align=right | 32,082
| align=right | 79.01
| align=right | 32,582
| align=right | 80.20
|-
| colspan="6" align=left|Source: Official results
|}

A leadership election in the PSD was held on 27 November 2021. The original date was 4 December 2021, but the party voted to advance the date in one week. MEP Paulo Rangel was a candidate for the leadership. He faced incumbent PSD leader Rui Rio, who announced his re-election bid on 19 October 2021. Around 46,000 party members, out of more than 85,000 active members, were registered to vote. On 27 November 2021, Rui Rio defeated Paulo Rangel by a 52.4% to 47.6% margin and was reelected for a 3rd term as party leader. The results were the following:

|- style="background-color:#E9E9E9"
! align="center" colspan=2 style="width:  60px"|Candidate
! align="center" style="width:  50px"|Votes
! align="center" style="width:  50px"|%
|-
|bgcolor=orange|
| align=left | Rui Rio
| align=right | 18,852
| align=right | 52.4
|-
|bgcolor=orange|
| align=left | Paulo Rangel
| align=right | 17,106
| align=right | 47.6
|-
| colspan=2 align=left | Blank/Invalid ballots
| align=right | 518
| align=right | –
|-
|- style="background-color:#E9E9E9"
| colspan=2 style="text-align:left;" |   Turnout
| align=right | 36,476
| align=right | 78.17
|-
| colspan="4" align=left|Source: Official results
|}

CDS – People's Party
CDS – People's Party also elected a new leader after former leader Assunção Cristas stepped down after the party's worst result ever in a general election in the 2019 elections. Five candidates were in the race: People's Youth leader Francisco Rodrigues dos Santos, current CDS MP from Aveiro João Almeida, former MP Filipe Lobo d'Ávila, Abel Matos Santos and Carlos Meira. The new leader was elected in a party congress between 25 and 26 January 2020. In that congress, in Aveiro city, Francisco Rodrigues dos Santos was elected leader with 46.4% of the delegates votes, against the 38.9% of João Almeida and 14.5% of Filipe Lobo d'Ávila. Abel Matos Santos and Carlos Meira had stepped down from the race, near the end of the congress but before the vote, in support of Rodrigues dos Santos. The results were the following:

|- style="background-color:#0c68b0"
! align="center" colspan=2 style="width:  60px"|Candidate
! align="center" style="width:  50px"|Votes
! align="center" style="width:  50px"|%
|-
|bgcolor=|
| align=left | Francisco Rodrigues dos Santos
| align=right | 671
| align=right | 46.5
|-
|bgcolor=|
| align=left | João Almeida
| align=right | 562
| align=right | 39.0
|-
|bgcolor=|
| align=left | Filipe Lobo d'Ávila
| align=right | 209
| align=right | 14.5
|-
| colspan=2 align=left | Blank/Invalid ballots
| align=right | 7
| align=right | –
|- style="background-color:#E9E9E9"
| colspan=2 style="text-align:left;" |   Turnout
| align=right | 1,449
| align=center | 
|-
| colspan="4" align=left|Source: Results
|}

People-Animals-Nature
In March 2021, the People-Animals-Nature (PAN) leader and spokesperson, André Silva, announced he was leaving the leadership of the party to dedicate more time to his family. A party congress to elect a new leader was scheduled for the weekend of 5–6 June 2021. For that leadership congress, only one candidate stepped forward, Inês Sousa Real, the party's parliamentary leader. On 6 June, Inês Sousa Real was elected as leader of PAN with 87.2% of the votes in the party's congress in Tomar. The results were the following:

|- style="background-color:#E9E9E9"
! align="center" colspan=2 style="width:  60px"|Candidate
! align="center" style="width:  50px"|Votes
! align="center" style="width:  50px"|%
|-
|bgcolor=teal|
| align=left | Inês Sousa Real
| align=right | 109
| align=right | 87.2
|-
| colspan=2 align=left | Blank/Invalid ballots
| align=right | 16
| align=right | 12.8
|- style="background-color:#E9E9E9"
| colspan=2 style="text-align:left;" |   Turnout
| align=right | 125
| align=center | 
|-
| colspan="4" align=left|Source: Results
|}

Date 

According to the Constitution of Portugal, an election must be called between 14 September and 14 October of the year that the legislature ends but can be called earlier. The election is then called by the president of Portugal, not at the sole request of the prime minister of Portugal, after listening to all of the parties represented in Parliament. The election date must be announced at least 60 days in advance if it is held as the legislature ends, but the election must be held within 55 days if it is called during an ongoing legislature (dissolution of parliament). The election day is the same in all multi-seat constituencies, and should fall on a Sunday or a national holiday. The next legislative election should have taken place no later than 8 October 2023; however, due to the rejection of the 2022 State Budget, during which the left-wing parties joined the right-wing parties and voted against the proposal, a snap election was called for 30 January 2022.

Electoral system 
The Assembly of the Republic has 230 members elected to four-year terms. Governments do not require absolute majority support of the Assembly to hold office, as even if the number of opposers of government is larger than that of the supporters, the number of opposers still needs to be equal or greater than 116 (absolute majority) for both the Government's Programme to be rejected or for a motion of no confidence to be approved.

The number of seats assigned to each district depends on the district magnitude. The use of the d'Hondt method makes for a higher effective threshold than certain other allocation methods such as the Hare quota or Sainte-Laguë method, which are more generous to small parties.

The distribution of MPs by electoral district was the following:

Voting during COVID-19
In January 2022, Portugal was experiencing rising infection rates as the SARS-CoV-2 Omicron variant had a prevalence of 93% among variants in the country. Because of this situation, thousands of voters were likely to be in isolation on 30 January, election day. To address this situation, the government asked for legal advice regarding the issue from the Portuguese Attorney-General's Office. On 19 January, the government announced that isolated voters would be able to vote on election day and recommended that these voters cast a ballot during the last hour the polls were open, between 6pm and 7pm 30 January.

Early voting
Voters were also able to vote early, which happened on 23 January, one week before election day. Voters had to register between 16 and 20 January 2022 in order to be eligible to cast an early ballot. By the 20 January deadline, 315,785 voters had requested to vote early, a number well below expectations. On 23 January, 285,848 voters (90.5% of voters that requested) cast an early ballot.

Parties

Parliamentary factions 
The table below lists the parties represented in the Assembly of the Republic during the 14th legislature (2019–2022) and that also contested the  2022 elections:

Non-represented parties 
The table below lists smaller parties not represented in the Assembly of the Republic that contested the elections in at least one constituency:

Rejected
A coalition between the People's Monarchist Party (PPM) and the United Party of Retirees and Pensioners (PURP) was rejected by the Constitutional Court because of several irregularities.

Campaign period

Party slogans

Candidates' debates

With parties represented in  Parliament
A total of 38 debates were scheduled for these elections. CDU leader, Jerónimo de Sousa, would only attend the debates on the main channels of each of the three main networks, RTP1, SIC and TVI. Therefore, he was absent from the debates in the news channels of the three networks, SIC Notícias, RTP3 and CNN Portugal. Shortly after, the debates between Jerónimo de Sousa and other party leaders on those cable channels, were cancelled, thus reducing the number of debates to 32. On 11 January 2022, the PCP announced that Jerónimo de Sousa would undergo urgent vascular surgery on 12 January and would be out of the campaign trail for 10 days, thus being absent in the debates. João Oliveira substituted him in the debate with PSD leader Rui Rio.

Rádio Observador organised two hour and a half debates with the head candidates for the Porto and Lisbon districts. The Porto debate aired on 11 January and the Lisbon  debate aired on 14 January.

With parties not represented in Parliament
A debate between parties not represented in Parliament was also held on RTP1.

Opinion polling

Results

National summary

{| class="wikitable" style="text-align:right; font-size:95%;"
|+ Summary of the 30 January 2022 Assembly of the Republic elections results
|-
| colspan=16| 
|-
! rowspan="2" colspan="2" style="background:#e9e9e9; text-align:left;" alignleft|Parties
! rowspan="2" style="background:#e9e9e9; text-align:right;"|Votes
! rowspan="2" style="background:#e9e9e9; text-align:right;"|%
! rowspan="2" style="background:#e9e9e9; text-align:right;"|±pp swing
! colspan="5" style="background:#e9e9e9; text-align:center;"|MPs
! rowspan="2" style="background:#e9e9e9; text-align:right;"|MPs %/votes %
|- style="background-color:#E9E9E9"
! style="background-color:#E9E9E9;text-align:center;"|2019
! style="background-color:#E9E9E9;text-align:center;"| 2022
! style="background:#e9e9e9; text-align:right;"|±
! style="background:#e9e9e9; text-align:right;"|%
! style="background:#e9e9e9; text-align:right;"|±
|-
|
||2,302,601||41.38||5.1||108||120||12||52.17||5.2||1.26
|-
|
||1,539,415||27.66||1.3||74||72||2||31.30||0.8||1.13
|-
|
||399,659||7.18||5.9||1||12||11||5.22||4.8||0.73
|-
|
||273,687||4.92||3.6||1||8||7||3.48||3.0||0.71
|-
|
||244,603||4.40||5.1||19||5||14||2.17||6.2||0.49
|-
|
||238,920||4.29||2.0||12||6||6||2.61||2.6||0.61
|-
|
||89,181||1.60||2.4||5||0||5||0.00||2.2||0.0
|-
| style="width: 10px" bgcolor="teal" align="center" |
| align="left" |People-Animals-Nature
||88,152||1.58||1.7||4||1||3||0.43||1.3||0.26
|-
|
||71,232||1.28||0.2||1||1||0||0.43||0.0||0.33
|-
|style="width: 10px" bgcolor=#FF9900 align="center" | 
|align=left|Madeira First 
||50,636||0.91||0.2||3||3||0||1.30||0.0||1.43
|-
| style="width: 9px" bgcolor="#FF9900" align="center" |
| align="left" |Democratic Alliance 

||28,330||0.51||0.1||2||2||0||0.87||0.0||1.71
|-
| style="width: 10px" bgcolor="LightSeaGreen" align="center" |
| align="left" |React, Include, Recycle
||23,233||0.42||0.3||0||0||0||0.00||0.0||0.0
|-
|
||11,265||0.20||0.5||0||0||0||0.00||0.0||0.0
|-
| style="width: 10px" bgcolor="blue" align="center" |
| align="left" |National Democratic Alternative
||10,874||0.20||0.0||0||0||0||0.00||0.0||0.0
|-
|
||10,786||0.19||0.0||0||0||0||0.00||0.0||0.0
|-
|
||7,561||0.14||0.1||0||0||0||0.00||0.0||0.0
|-
| style="width: 10px" bgcolor="" align="center" |
| align="left" |Volt Portugal
||6,240||0.11||||||0||||0.00||||0.0
|-
|
||6,157||0.11||0.0||0||0||0||0.00||0.0||0.0
|-
| style="width: 10px" bgcolor="#002147" align="center" |
| align="left" |Rise Up
||5,043||0.09||0.2||0||0||0||0.00||0.0||0.0
|-
|
||3,880||0.07||0.1||0||0||0||0.00||0.0||0.0
|-
| style="width: 10px" bgcolor="#CC0033" align="center" |
| align="left" |Labour
||3,533||0.06||0.1||0||0||0||0.00||0.0||0.0
|-
| style="width: 10px" bgcolor="#6AD1E3" align="center" |
| align="left" |Alliance
||2,467||0.04||0.7||0||0||0||0.00||0.0||0.0
|-
|
||260||0.00||0.2||0||0||0||0.00||0.0||0.0
|-
|colspan=2 align=left style="background-color:#E9E9E9"|Total valid
|width="65" align="right" style="background-color:#E9E9E9"|5,417,715
|width="40" align="right" style="background-color:#E9E9E9"|97.36
|width="40" align="right" style="background-color:#E9E9E9"|2.3
|width="40" align="right" style="background-color:#E9E9E9"|230
|width="40" align="right" style="background-color:#E9E9E9"|230
|width="40" align="right" style="background-color:#E9E9E9"|0
|width="40" align="right" style="background-color:#E9E9E9"|100.00
|width="40" align="right" style="background-color:#E9E9E9"|0
|width="40" align="right" style="background-color:#E9E9E9"|—
|-
|colspan=2|Blank ballots
||63,103||1.13||1.4||colspan=6 rowspan=4|
|-
|colspan=2|Invalid ballots
||83,721||1.50||0.9
|-
|colspan=2 align=left style="background-color:#E9E9E9"|Total
|width="50" align="right" style="background-color:#E9E9E9"|5,564,539
|width="40" align="right" style="background-color:#E9E9E9"|100.00
|width="40" align="right" style="background-color:#E9E9E9"|
|-
|colspan=2|Registered voters/turnout
||10,813,246||51.46||2.9
|-
| colspan=11 align=left | Source: Comissão Nacional de Eleições
|}

Distribution by constituency

|- class="unsortable"
!rowspan=2|Constituency!!%!!S!!%!!S!!%!!S!!%!!S!!%!!S!!%!!S!!%!!S!!%!!S!!%!!S!!%!!S
!rowspan=2|TotalS
|- class="unsortable" style="text-align:center;"
!colspan=2 | PS
!colspan=2 | PSD
!colspan=2 | CH
!colspan=2 | IL
!colspan=2 | CDU
!colspan=2 | BE
!colspan=2 | MF
!colspan=2 | AD
!colspan=2 | PAN
!colspan=2 | L
|-
| style="text-align:left;" | Azores
| style="background:; color:white;"| 42.8
| 3
|colspan="2" bgcolor="#AAAAAA"|
| 5.9
| -
| 4.1
| -
| 1.5
| -
| 4.3
| -
|colspan="2" rowspan="12" bgcolor="#AAAAAA"|
| 33.9
| 2
| 1.4
| -
| 0.9
| -
| 5
|-
| style="text-align:left;" | Aveiro
| style="background:; color:white;"| 39.5
| 8
| 35.7
| 7
| 5.6
| 1
| 4.5
| -
| 1.8
| -
| 4.6
| -
|colspan="2" rowspan="21" bgcolor="#AAAAAA"|
| 1.3
| -
| 0.8
| -
| 16
|-
| style="text-align:left;" | Beja
| style="background:; color:white;"| 43.7
| 2
| 15.9
| -
| 10.3
| -
| 2.1
| -
| 18.4
| 1
| 3.7
| -
| 0.9
| -
| 0.7
| -
| 3
|-
| style="text-align:left;" | Braga
| style="background:; color:white;"| 42.0
| 9
| 34.8
| 8
| 5.8
| 1
| 4.3
| 1
| 2.6
| -
| 3.7
| -
| 1.2
| -
| 0.8
| -
| 19
|-
| style="text-align:left;" | Bragança
| style="background:; color:white;"| 40.3
| 2
| 40.3
| 1
| 8.6
| -
| 1.6
| -
| 1.4
| -
| 2.1
| -
| 0.6
| -
| 0.4
| -
| 3
|-
| style="text-align:left;" | Castelo Branco
| style="background:; color:white;"| 47.7
| 3
| 27.4
| 1
| 8.3
| -
| 2.6
| -
| 2.9
| -
| 4.3
| -
| 1.0
| -
| 0.8
| -
| 4
|-
| style="text-align:left;" | Coimbra
| style="background:; color:white;"| 45.2
| 6
| 29.1
| 3
| 6.1
| -
| 3.6
| -
| 3.4
| -
| 5.1
| -
| 1.2
| -
| 1.0
| -
| 9
|-
| style="text-align:left;" | Évora
| style="background:; color:white;"| 44.0
| 2
| 21.4
| 1
| 9.2
| -
| 2.5
| -
| 14.6
| -
| 3.3
| -
| 0.8
| -
| 0.6
| -
| 3
|-
| style="text-align:left;" | Faro
| style="background:; color:white;"| 39.9
| 5
| 24.4
| 3
| 12.3
| 1
| 4.6
| -
| 4.8
| -
| 5.8
| -
| 2.2
| -
| 1.1
| -
| 9
|-
| style="text-align:left;" | Guarda
| style="background:; color:white;"| 45.1
| 2
| 33.5
| 1
| 8.0
| -
| 1.9
| -
| 1.8
| -
| 3.1
| -
| 0.7
| -
| 0.5
| -
| 3
|-
| style="text-align:left;" | Leiria
| style="background:; color:white;"| 35.7
| 5
| 34.7
| 4
| 8.0
| 1
| 5.3
| -
| 3.1
| -
| 4.5
| -
| 1.3
| -
| 1.1
| -
| 10
|-
| style="text-align:left;" | Lisbon
| style="background:; color:white;"| 40.8
| 21
| 24.2
| 13
| 7.8
| 4
| 7.9
| 4
| 5.1
| 2
| 4.7
| 2
| 2.0
| 1
| 2.4
| 1
| 48
|-
| style="text-align:left;" | Madeira
| 31.5
| 3
|colspan="2" bgcolor="#AAAAAA"|
| 6.1
| -
| 3.3
| -
| 2.0
| -
| 3.2
| -
| style="background:; color:white;"| 39.8
| 3
| 1.6
| -
| 0.7
| -
| 6
|-
| style="text-align:left;" | Portalegre
| style="background:; color:white;"| 47.2
| 2
| 23.2
| -
| 11.5
| -
| 2.1
| -
| 7.6
| -
| 2.9
| -
|colspan="2" rowspan="9" bgcolor="#AAAAAA"|
| 0.6
| -
| 0.6
| -
| 2
|-
| style="text-align:left;" | Porto
| style="background:; color:white;"| 42.5
| 19
| 32.3
| 14
| 4.4
| 2
| 5.1
| 2
| 3.3
| 1
| 4.8
| 2
| 1.7
| -
| 1.2
| -
| 40
|-
| style="text-align:left;" | Santarém
| style="background:; color:white;"| 41.2
| 5
| 26.9
| 3
| 10.9
| 1
| 3.8
| -
| 5.4
| -
| 4.6
| -
| 1.2
| -
| 0.9
| -
| 9
|-
| style="text-align:left;" | Setúbal
| style="background:; color:white;"| 45.7
| 10
| 16.2
| 3
| 9.0
| 1
| 5.1
| 1
| 10.1
| 2
| 5.8
| 1
| 2.0
| -
| 1.4
| -
| 18
|-
| style="text-align:left;" | Viana do Castelo
| style="background:; color:white;"| 42.1
| 3
| 34.2
| 3
| 6.1
| -
| 2.9
| -
| 3.0
| -
| 3.5
| -
| 1.0
| -
| 0.7
| -
| 6
|-
| style="text-align:left;" | Vila Real
| style="background:; color:white;"| 41.3
| 3
| 40.0
| 2
| 7.2
| -
| 1.8
| -
| 1.7
| -
| 2.3
| -
| 0.8
| -
| 0.6
| -
| 5
|-
| style="text-align:left;" | Viseu
| style="background:; color:white;"| 41.5
| 4
| 36.8
| 4
| 7.8
| -
| 2.5
| -
| 1.6
| -
| 2.8
| -
| 0.9
| -
| 0.6
| -
| 8
|-
| style="text-align:left;" | Europe
| style="background:; color:white;"| 33.0
| 2
| 15.0
| -
| 7.1
| -
| 2.5
| -
| 1.3
| -
| 2.4
| -
| 2.7
| -
| 1.4
| -
| 2
|-
| style="text-align:left;" | Outside Europe
| 29.8
| 1
| style="background:; color:white;"| 37.5
| 1
| 9.6
| -
| 3.6
| -
| 1.4
| -
| 2.6
| -
| 4.5
| -
| 1.0
| -
| 2
|- class="unsortable" style="background:#E9E9E9"
| style="text-align:left;" | Total
| style="background:; color:white;"| 41.4
| 120
| 27.7
| 72
| 7.2
| 12
| 4.9
| 8
| 4.3
| 6
| 4.4
| 5
| 0.9
| 3
| 0.5
| 2
| 1.6
| 1
| 1.3
| 1
| 230
|-
| colspan=23 style="text-align:left;" | Source: Election Results
|}

Maps

Electorate

Aftermath and reactions
The Socialist Party (PS) of incumbent prime minister António Costa won an unexpected absolute majority in the Assembly of the Republic, the second in the party's history. The PS received 41.5% of the vote and 118 seats, two above the minimum required for a majority. The PS won the most votes in all districts in mainland Portugal, only failing to win Madeira. Commentators considered the PS to have benefited from a transfer of the BE and the Unitary Democratic Coalition (CDU) voters to them. Costa said that his "absolute majority doesn't mean absolute power" and that he would still be open to forming a coalition, despite it no longer being a requirement to govern. He also promised reforms, saying: "The conditions have been created to carry out investments and reforms for Portugal to be more prosperous, fairer, more innovative."

The Social Democratic Party (PSD) remained stable, underperforming opinion polls that had predicted a close race with the PS. The PSD won 29.2% of the vote, a slightly higher share than in 2019, and received 77 seats, two less than the previous election. The PSD was surpassed by the PS in districts like Leiria and Viseu, and lost Bragança district by only 15 votes to the PS. In the aftermath of the election, party leader Rui Rio announced he would resign from the leadership.

CHEGA finished in third place, winning 12 seats and 7.3% of the vote. The Liberal Initiative (IL) finished in fourth place, winning 8 seats and 4.9% of the vote. Both parties experienced a surge of voters and made gains in this election. CHEGA leader André Ventura celebrated a "great night", though the party received more than 100,000 less votes than Ventura had received in the previous year's presidential election, an election in which turnout was lower. He blamed the PS majority on PSD leader Rio for not forming an alliance between the two right-wing parties and stated "From now on there won't be a soft opposition. We will assume the role of being the real opposition to the Socialists and restore dignity to this country." IL leader João Cotrim de Figueiredo also celebrated sufficient gains to form a parliamentary group, and said that his party would be a "firm opposition to socialism".

Both the BE and CDU suffered losses, being surpassed by the CHEGA and IL, with 5 seats and 4.4% of the vote; their rejection of the 2022 budget was considered to be a factor in losing votes and seats, as well as tactical voting to avoid a PSD plurality.  The CDU won 6 seats and 4.3% of the vote, while losing seats in Évora and Santerém districts. The Ecologist Party "The Greens" (PEV) lost all their seats for the first time. Catarina Martins of the BE blamed the PS for having created a "false crisis" that she believed had resulted in a polarised election that penalised parties to the left of the PS. She also spoke out against the gains for CHEGA. Portuguese Communist Party leader Jerónimo de Sousa made a similar statement about the PS.

The CDS – People's Party (CDS–PP) lost all their seats for the first time, receiving 1.6% of the vote. Party leader Francisco Rodrigues dos Santos announced his resignation. Also due to tactical voting, People Animals Nature (PAN) suffered losses, winning 1 seat and 1.6% of the vote, 3 fewer seats than in the previous election. PAN leader Inês Sousa Real spoke of sadness after this result, and said that an absolute majority would be bad for democracy. LIVRE won 1 seat and received 1.3% of the vote, holding on to the single seat they won in the previous election, with party leader Rui Tavares being elected in Lisbon. Tavares pledged to get Costa to work with other left-wing parties.

The voter turnout was the highest since the 2015 Portuguese legislative election, with 51.5% of registered voters casting a ballot.

Overseas ballots controversy
In this election, 257,791 ballots from overseas were received, but, during the process of counting the ballots, a controversy started. The Social Democratic Party (PSD) filed a complaint in order for the ballots with no ID card copy to be put aside. The Portuguese electoral law requires that for a ballot received by mail to be valid, it needs to be accompanied with an ID card copy of the voter (in order to confirm the identity of the voter, as the equivalent of presenting the ID to the poll workers when voting in person). The Socialist Party (PS) protested against the PSD complaint, reminding the PSD that all parties had had an informal meeting in which it had been decided that all ballots, with or without an ID card copy, would be counted and declared valid. The PSD had confirmed their position in that meeting, but announced that they had changed their mind after they were given a document stating that any such actions would be illegal. Nonetheless, the PSD and the Electoral Commission (CNE) warned and advised counting staffs to separate the ballots. But this guideline wasn't followed by several counting staffs, and by the end of the counting of ballots, 80.32% of the Europe constituency ballots, 157,205 ballots out from a total of 195,701, were considered invalid and thrown out. Several parties (Volt, LIVRE, PAN, CHEGA, MAS) appealed to the Constitutional Court in order to have the ballots counted. Of the 5 complaints filed, however, the court accepted only Volt Portugal's complaint. On 15 February, the Court annulled the election in the Europe constituency and demanded a repetition of the vote. The National Election Committee determined that for the rerun of the parliamentary elections in the constituency of Europe on March 12 and 13 can be voted in person, just as until March 23 by absentee ballot. 109,350 ballots were received until 23 March, and of those, 30% (32,777) were declared null as they were not accompanied with an ID card copy. In terms of results, the PS was able to win the two seats from the Europe constituency, unlike in the original election when the PS and PSD both won one seat.

International reactions 
Spanish prime minister Pedro Sánchez, leader of the Spanish Socialist Workers' Party, congratulated Costa on Twitter, stating that "Portugal has once again opted for a social democratic project that combines growth and social justice. Together we will continue to promote in our countries and in Europe a socialist response to the challenges we share." The European Commission's First Vice-president Frans Timmermans congratulated Costa's victory on Twitter as "an important victory for Portugal and Europe." Keir Starmer, the British opposition and Labour Party leader, congratulated Costa on Twitter for "a victory for seriousness in government, shared prosperity and social justice."

Indian prime minister Narendra Modi congratulated Costa, who is Luso-Indian, on Twitter "for resounding performance in the parliamentary elections in Portugal and his re-election." He also stated: "Look forward to continue deepening the warm and time-tested relationship with Portugal." Luiz Inácio Lula da Silva, then former president of Brazil and presidential pre-candidate in the 2022 Brazilian general election, congratulated Costa and his party for "their great electoral victory in Portugal", wishing them "good luck".

See also
 Elections in Portugal
 List of political parties in Portugal
 Politics of Portugal

Notes

References

External links 
 Marktest, opinion poll tracker
 Official results site, Portuguese Ministry of Internal Administration
 Portuguese Electoral Commission
 ERC, official publication of polls
 Average of polls and seat simulator

Legislative
January 2022 events in Portugal
2022